Yam Kisi Se Kam Nahin (Yam is not less than anyone') is a television comedy show on the Indian channel EPIC. It is based on the fictional marital daily life of Hindu god Yamraj. It features Rajesh Kumar as Yamraj and Reema Vohra as his chirpy Gujrati wife Jigna.

The show aired on Ishara TV during COVID-19 pandemic lockdown in 2021 when TV serial shootings were stopped in Maharashtra and Ishara TV didn't have bank episodes for serials.

Episodes

Cast
 Rajesh Kumar as Lord Yamraj. He is miser due to low earnings and hence is not well treated by Jigna and her parents. He tries to give best treatment to his family but all plans go into vain due his brother-in-law Himesh which usually causes troubles and losses.
 Reema Worah as Jigna, Yamraj's wife, Himen and Jyotiben's daughter, Himesh's sister. She is a Gujarati woman from Earth. She is jealous of her neighbour Mandira and wants all facilities and luxuries of life. Her parents frequently visit her and curse Yamraj for her discomfort. 
 Alam Khan as Himesh, Himen and Jyotiben's son, Jigna's younger brother. He causes troubles for which Jigna blames Yamraj.
 Deepak Pareek as Lord Chitragupt, Mandira's husband and Satya's father. He is wealthy and Yamraj's neighbour.
 Eva Ahuja as Mandira Gupta, Chitragutp's wife, Satya's mother. She always wears heavy jewelry to make Jigna jealous. She also tries to create misunderstanding between Yamraaj and Jigna for her pass-time.
 Ahsaas Channa as Mohini, Himesh and Satya's friend. Both Satya and Himesh have secret crush on her. Despite this, she doesnt give them much needed attention.
 Abhishek Pattnaik as Atmanand Diwedi. He was mistakenly killed by Yamraj on his marriage and promotion day and hence has secret grudges against him. He was appointed as Yamdut, Yamraj's emissary assistant as compensation for his death. He is overqualified assistant from IIT and IIM. Though being overqualified, he is being exploited by Yam and his family.
 Ayush Narang as Satya, Mandira and Chitragutp's son, Mohini and Himesh's friend. He secretly has a crush on Mohini and often considers Himesh as his rival.
 Sheela Sharma as Jyotiben, Himen's wife, Jigna and Himesh's mother. She always taunts Yamraj for Jigna's discomfort which is usually caused by Himesh.
 Shaynam Ladakhi as Bahadur. Yamlok's security watchman.(Episode- Unwelcome Guest)
 Beenna Malje as Pinky. Yamraj's fake wife.(Episode-Amnesia)

Production

Digital Availability 
The entire show is available on Ishara Channel YouTube channel and aired during May and June 2021.

References

Indian comedy television series
2014 Indian television series debuts
Epic TV original programming
Indian fantasy television series
Hindu mythology in popular culture